Edward Joseph How (16 May 1974 – 28 March 2012) was an English first-class cricketer, banker and educator.

How was born at Amersham in May 1974. He was educated at Dr Challoner's Grammar School, before going up to Gonville and Caius College, Cambridge. While studying at Cambridge, he played first-class cricket for Cambridge University Cricket Club between 1995 and 1997, making fourteen appearances. A largely ineffective left-arm medium-fast bowler against first-class county opponents, he took 13 wickets at an average of 88.07. His one bowling performance of note came against Kent in 1997, with figures of 5 for 59. He also played football for Cambridge University A.F.C., gaining a football blue.

After graduating from Cambridge, How worked in the City of London for Deutsche Bank, becoming a vice-president at the bank. He then changed careers, becoming a chemistry teacher at Charterhouse School, where he also coached cricket and football. How was killed in an off-piste skiing accident at Val-d'Isère in France on 28 March 2012, having fallen  to his death. He was survived by his wife and child.

References

External links

1974 births
2012 deaths
People from Amersham
People educated at Dr Challoner's Grammar School
Alumni of Gonville and Caius College, Cambridge
English cricketers
Cambridge University cricketers
Cambridge University A.F.C. players
English bankers
Deutsche Bank people
Schoolteachers from London
Skiing deaths
Sport deaths in France
20th-century English businesspeople
English footballers
Association footballers not categorized by position